Mollerup is a surname. Notable people with the surname include:

Asta Mollerup (1881–1945), Danish dance teacher
Johannes Mollerup (1872–1937), Danish mathematician
Merete Ahnfeldt-Mollerup (born 1963), Danish architect, university professor and writer
Per Mollerup (born 1942), Danish designer, academic, and author

See also
Bohr–Mollerup theorem